Valentina Dmitrievna Melnikova (born 28 February 1946, in Moscow) is a Russian human rights activist and politician, member of the Civic Council attached to the Russian Defence Ministry, and responsible secretary of the Union of Committees of Soldiers’ Mothers of Russia.

Since 2012, she has been a member of the Bureau of the Federal Political Council of the “Republican Party of Russia — the People's Freedom Party”. In 2005-2012 she was co-chair of the Republican Party of Russia. Previously she was leader of the United National Party of Soldiers’ Mothers.

In 2011, she was ranked as No. 22 in “top 100 most influential Russian women”.

Biography 
Valentina Melnikova was born on 28 February 1946 in Moscow. She is a graduate of M. V. Lomonosov Moscow State University, Faculty of Geology.

Melnikova worked as an engineer in the V. I. Vernadskii Institute of Geochemistry and Analytical Chemistry, Union-wide Institute of Mineral Raw Materials, faculty of geochemistry, M. V. Lomonosov Moscow State University.

From 1989, Melnikova has been active in conducting human rights and educational work in the Union-wide Committee of Soldiers’ Mothers, and later in the Committee of Soldiers’ Mothers of Russia, as press secretary.

From 1990 to 1995, Melnikova was co-founder and deputy director of “Khronos”, a small enterprise producing Xray equipment.

In 1998, Melnikova initiated the foundation of the Russia-wide association “Union of Committees of Soldiers’ Mothers of Russia”, and was elected responsible secretary of the Union.

In November 2004, she was elected chair of the United National Party of Soldiers’ Mothers at that party's founding congress.

After the Party of Soldiers’ Mothers merged with the Republican Party of Russia, Melnikova was elected co-chair of the Republican Party, at the party congress held in December 2005. She remained in this role until 2012.

Since 2012, Melnikova has been a member of the Bureau of the Federal Political Council of the party “Republican Party of Russia — Party of National Freedom”.

References

1946 births
Living people
Russian activists against the 2022 Russian invasion of Ukraine
Russian human rights activists
Women human rights activists